Mbakaou is a village in the Adamawa Region of Cameroon. It is part of the commune of Tibati. The economy is based mainly on fishing.

References

Bibliography 
 P. Dubreuil, J. Guiscafre, J.-F. Nouvelot, J.-C. Olivry, « Le Djerem à Mbakaou », in Le bassin de la rivière Sanaga, ORSTOM, Paris, 1975, 
 Sirri Gerrard, « Fishery and Gender in Mbakaou, a Northern Cameroonian Village », in Mega-Tchad, 1994, No. 2, p. 43-46.

See also 
 
 

Populated places in Adamawa Region